Santa Claus Conquers the Martians is a 1964 American science fiction comedy film directed by Nicholas Webster, produced and written by Paul L. Jacobson, based on a story by Glenville Mareth, that stars John Call as Santa Claus. It also features a ten-year-old Pia Zadora as Girmar, one of the Martian children.

The film also marks the first documented appearance of Mrs. Claus in a motion picture (Doris Rich plays the role), coming three weeks before the television special Rudolph the Red-Nosed Reindeer, which also featured Mrs. Claus.

The film regularly appears on lists of the worst films ever made, is regularly featured in the "bottom 100" list on the Internet Movie Database and was featured in an episode of the syndicated series of the Canned Film Festival of 1986. Santa Claus Conquers the Martians took on newfound fame in the 1990s after being featured on an episode of the comedy series Mystery Science Theater 3000.

That episode became a holiday staple on the Comedy Central cable channel in the years following its premiere in 1991. It has since found new life again, as it has been the subject of new riffing by Cinematic Titanic and RiffTrax, both productions of former MST3K writers and performers. The film was also featured on Elvira's Movie Macabre.

Plot
The Martians Momar ("Mom Martian") and Kimar ("King Martian") are worried that their children Girmar ("Girl Martian") and Bomar ("Boy Martian") are watching too much Earth television, most notably station KID-TV's interview with Santa Claus in his workshop at Earth's North Pole.

Consulting the ancient 800-year-old Martian sage Chochem (a Yiddish/Hebrew word meaning "sage", though pronounced differently from the film's version), they are advised that the children of Mars are growing distracted due to the society's overly rigid structure. From infancy, all their education is fed into their brains through machines and they are not allowed individuality or freedom of thought.

Chochem notes that he had seen this coming "for centuries" and says that the only way to help the children is to allow them their freedom and be allowed to have fun. To do this, Mars needs a Santa Claus figure, like on Earth. Leaving Chochem's cave, the Martian leaders decide to abduct Santa Claus from Earth and bring him to Mars.

The Martians cannot distinguish between all the fake Santas, so they kidnap two children to find the real one. Once this is accomplished, one Martian, Voldar, who strongly disagrees with the idea, repeatedly tries to kill Santa Claus along with the two kidnapped Earth children. He believes that Santa is corrupting the children of Mars and turning them away from Mars' original glory.

When they arrive on Mars, Santa and the children build a factory to make toys for the Martian children. However, Voldar and his assistants, Stobo and Shim, sabotage the factory and change its programming so that it makes the toys incorrectly. Meanwhile, Dropo, Kimar's assistant, who has taken a great liking to Santa Claus and Christmas, puts on one of Santa's spare suits and starts acting like Santa Claus. He goes to the toy factory to make toys, but Voldar mistakes him for Santa and kidnaps him.

When Santa and the children come back to the factory to make more toys, they discover that someone has tampered with the machines. Voldar and Stobo come back to the factory to make a deal with Kimar, but when they see the real Santa Claus, they realize that their plan has been foiled. Dropo, held hostage in a cave, tricks his guard Shim and escapes. Kimar then arrests Voldar, Stobo, and Shim. Santa notices that Dropo acts like him and says that Dropo would make a good Martian Santa Claus. Kimar agrees and sends Santa and the children back to Earth.

Cast

 John Call as Santa Claus
 Leonard Hicks as Kimar
 Vincent Beck as Voldar
 Bill McCutcheon as Dropo
 Victor Stiles as Billy
 Donna Conforti as Betty
 Chris Month as Bomar
 Pia Zadora as Girmar
 Leila Martin as Momar
 Charles Renn as Hargo
 James Cahill as Rigna
 Ned Wertimer as Andy Anderson
 Doris Rich as Mrs. Claus
 Carl Don as Chochem / Von Green
 Ivor Bodin as Winky
 Al Nesor as Stobo 
 Don Blair as the announcer

Production
The film was the idea of producer Paul Jacobson, who worked in video production and wanted to move into features. He hired writer Glenville Mareth to develop the idea and Nicholas Webster to direct and made the film through his own Jalor Productions. Jacobson called the film a "yuletide science fiction fantasy" and said he made it because of a perceived gap in the market. "Except for the Disneys, there's very little in film houses that children recognize as their own".

Jacobson succeeded in selling the film's distribution rights to Joseph E. Levine. Filming took place over two weeks from July to August 1964, at the Michael Myerberg Studios on Long Island.

Jacobson said "at this particular studio, with a group of wonderfully cooperative technicians, we've been able to get a lot of production value from our low budget. We're also shooting in color to get full, picturesque effects with our toy factors and Martian and North Pole backgrounds". Cast members John Call and Victor Stiles were appearing on stage in Oliver! while Donna Conforti was appearing in Here's Love on Broadway.

In an interview in June 1966, Levine said he had made 15 "family type pictures" in 18 months "but don't let it get around. I don't want anybody to know because families don't go to see them – they just talk about them. But I make them anyway because I have the protection of the television. Money in the bank, the television".

Release

The film was released in time for Christmas 1964. After that, it was regularly re-released at Christmastime for matinees.

Box office
In February 1965, the New York Times said on its release that the film "reaped a box office bonanza in a regular, multi theatre booking".

Critical reception
Santa Claus Conquers the Martians received mostly negative reviews, with most of its positive feedback coming in the form of the film being so bad, it's good. The site's critical consensus reads, "The endearingly cheesy Santa Claus Conquers the Martians might just be so naughty it's nice for viewers seeking a sub-competent sci-fi holiday adventure." The film has since been viewed as a cult film.

Home media
Due to its public domain status in the United States, Santa Claus Conquers the Martians has been released on many different bargain bin price labels. StudioCanal holds ancillary rights to the film.

 Originally broadcast on The Comedy Channel on December 21, 1991, the Mystery Science Theater 3000 version of the film was released on DVD by Rhino Home Video as part of MST3K: The Essentials on August 31, 2004.
 Mill Creek Entertainment released the film on DVD as part of their Holiday Family Collection in 2006.
 Cinematic Titanic riffed the film on DVD, released in November 2008.
 The Cinema Insomnia version was released by Apprehensive Films as part of their Slime Line series.
 The bonus content of the DVD Rare Exports: A Christmas Tale includes the film.
 E1 Entertainment's version from the 2010-11 syndicated television series, Elvira's Movie Macabre, was released on DVD on December 6, 2011.
 Kino Lorber planned to release a Santa Claus Conquers the Martians: Kino Classics Special Edition on Blu-ray and DVD on October 30, 2012. However, it was discovered that the discs had been pressed using a severely truncated master copy, running only 69 minutes. A new version was released on December 4, 2012, with the original running time intact.
 RiffTrax, a production of several former MST3K writers and performers, selected the film for riffing in a live event held on December 5, 2013, and broadcast to movie theaters around the country. The live show became available as a digital download on August 1, 2014 and was released on DVD on November 24, 2015. The show was presented as a double feature with Christmas Shorts-stravaganza!, a RiffTrax collection of holiday shorts, on December 1, 2016.
 It's also part of Weird Christmas on Fandor.

Influence and legacy
The theme from the film was released on record in November 1964 by "Milton Delugg and the Little Eskimos" on Four Corners Records, a subsidiary of Kapp Records. Its catalog number was FC 4-114. It did not reach the charts.

A single-issue comic book adaptation and read-along of the film was published by Dell Comics in March 1966.

The film was featured in season 3 episode 21 of Mystery Science Theater 3000 in 1991.

A theatrical production of Santa Claus Conquers the Martians: The Musical premiered in 1993 at the Factory Theatre in Chicago, adapted and directed by Sean Abley.

Beginning in February 1998, a remake was rumored with David Zucker as producer, and Jim Carrey attached to play Dropo. An estimated release date was announced as 2002, though the film was then believed to have gone into development hell. As of December 2020, IMDb lists a remake with a projected 2021 release date, directed by Cynthia Webster, the daughter of the original film's director.

It spawned a tongue-in-cheek novelization by Lou Harry, released in 2005 by Penguin Books/Chamberlain Bros. The book, which includes a DVD of the original film, presents the story from the perspective of a now-adult Girmar, who has not only succeeded her father as the ruler of Mars but also narrates the tale in a 'valley girl' type of language.

In 2006, a second theatrical production premiered at the Maverick Theater in Fullerton, California. This version was adapted by Brian Newell and Nick McGee. The Maverick's production has become a comedic success and a local tradition that has been performed there every holiday season since 2006, with a 10th-anniversary production being performed in December 2015.

Sloppy Seconds covered the theme song in 1992.

See also
 Santa Claus in film
 List of Christmas films
 List of films set on Mars
 List of films considered the worst
 List of American films of 1964
 Public domain film
 List of films in the public domain in the United States

References

External links

 
 
 
 
 
 
 Orange County Register review of Santa Claus Conquers the Martians at the Maverick Theater 2006
Said MST3K episode on ShoutFactoryTV

1964 films
1960s adventure comedy films
1960s science fiction comedy films
1960s fantasy comedy films
1964 independent films
American Christmas comedy films
American science fiction comedy films
American fantasy comedy films
American independent films
American robot films
Alien abduction films
1960s English-language films
Films about extraterrestrial life
Films adapted into comics
Films shot in New York (state)
Mars in film
Santa Claus in film
1960s Christmas films
Embassy Pictures films
1964 comedy films
Films directed by Nicholas Webster
1960s American films